Republicanism in the United Kingdom is the political movement that seeks to replace the United Kingdom's monarchy with a republic. Supporters of the movement, called republicans, support alternative forms of governance to a monarchy, such as an elected head of state.

Monarchy has been the form of government used in the countries that now make up the United Kingdom almost exclusively since the Middle Ages. A republican government existed in England and Wales, later along with Ireland and Scotland, in the mid-17th century as a result of the Parliamentarian victory in the English Civil War. The Commonwealth of England, as the period was called, lasted from the execution of Charles I in 1649 until the Restoration of the monarchy in 1660.

Context
In Britain, republican sentiment has largely focused on the abolition of the British monarch, rather than the dissolution of the British Union or independence for its constituent countries. In Northern Ireland, the term "republican" is usually used in the sense of Irish republicanism. While also against the monarchy, Irish republicans are against the presence of the British state in any form on the island of Ireland and advocate creating a united Ireland, an all-island state comprising the whole of Ireland. Unionists who support a British republic also exist in Northern Ireland.

There are republican members of the Scottish National Party (SNP) in Scotland and Plaid Cymru in Wales who advocate independence for those countries as republics. The SNP's official policy is that the British monarch would remain head of state of an independent Scotland, unless the people of Scotland decided otherwise. Plaid Cymru have a similar view for Wales, although its youth wing, Plaid Ifanc, has an official policy advocating a Welsh republic. The Scottish Socialist Party and the Scottish Greens both support an independent Scottish republic.

History
Since the 1650s, early modern English republicanism has been extensively studied by historians. James Harrington (1611–1677) is generally considered to be the most representative republican writer of the era.

Commonwealth of England

The countries that now make up the United Kingdom, together with the Republic of Ireland, were briefly ruled as a republic in the 17th century, first under the Commonwealth consisting of the Rump Parliament and the Council of State (1649–1653) and then under the Protectorate of Oliver Cromwell and later his son Richard (1658–1659), and finally under the restored Rump Parliament (1659–1660). The Commonwealth Parliament represented itself as a republic in the classical model, with John Milton writing an early defence of republicanism in the idiom of constitutional limits on a monarch's power. Cromwell's Protectorate was less ideologically republican and was seen by Cromwell as restoring the mixed constitution of monarchy, aristocracy and democracy found in classical literature and English common law discourse.

First the Kingdom of England was declared to be the Commonwealth of England and then Scotland and Ireland were briefly forced into union with England by the army. Cromwell and Thomas Fairfax were often ruthless in putting down the mutinies which occurred within their own army towards the end of the civil wars (prompted by Parliament's failure to pay the troops). They showed little sympathy for the Levellers, an egalitarian movement which had contributed greatly to Parliament's cause but sought representation for ordinary citizens. The Leveller point of view had been strongly represented in the Putney Debates, held between the various factions of the army in 1647, just prior to the king's temporary escape from army custody. Cromwell and the grandees were not prepared to permit such a radical democracy and used the debates to play for time while the future of the King was being determined. Catholics were persecuted zealously under Cromwell. Although he personally was in favour of religious toleration – "liberty for tender consciences" – not all his compatriots agreed. The war led to much death and chaos in Ireland where Irish Catholics and Protestants who fought for the Royalists were persecuted. There was a ban on many forms of entertainment, as public meetings could be used as a cover for conspirators; horse racing was banned, the maypoles were famously cut down, the theatres were closed, and Christmas celebrations were outlawed for being too ceremonial, Catholic, and "popish".

Much of Cromwell's power was due to the Rump Parliament, a Parliament purged of opposition to grandees in the New Model Army. Whereas Charles I had been in part restrained by a Parliament that would not always do as he wished (the cause of the civil war), Cromwell was able to wield much more power as only loyalists were allowed to become MPs, turning the chamber into a rubber-stamping organisation. This was ironic given his complaints about Charles I acting without heeding the "wishes" of the people. Even so, he found it almost impossible to get his Parliaments to follow all his wishes. His executive decisions were often thwarted, most famously in the ending of the rule of the regional major generals appointed by himself.

In 1657 Cromwell was offered the crown by Parliament, presenting him with a dilemma since he had played a great role in abolishing the monarchy. After two months of deliberation, he rejected the offer. Instead, he was ceremonially re-installed as Lord Protector of England, Scotland and Ireland (Wales was a part of England), with greater powers than he had previously held. It is often suggested that offering Cromwell the crown was an effort to curb his power: as a king, he would be obliged to honour agreements such as Magna Carta, but under the arrangement, he had designed he had no such restraints. This allowed him to preserve and enhance his power and the army's while decreasing Parliament's control over him, probably to enable him to maintain a well-funded army that Parliament could not be depended upon to provide. The office of Lord Protector was not formally hereditary, although Cromwell was able to nominate his own successor in his son, Richard. 

A common argument against republicanism in Britain is that of the supposed failure of Cromwell when England was a republic. However, Republicans argue that this cannot be used as an argument against republicanism as it is nowhere near what a modern republic would be. In the time of Cromwell, the political system and powers of the head of state were very different to today. Most noticeably, if the UK was to be a republic today, it would most likely have a president with limited power who acts simply as a representative of the country much like the current monarch does.

Restoration of the monarchy
Although England, Scotland and Ireland became constitutional monarchies, after the reigns of Charles II and his brother James II and VII, and with the ascension of William III and Mary II to the English, Irish and Scottish thrones as a result of the Glorious Revolution of 1688, there have been movements throughout the last few centuries whose aims were to remove the monarchy and establish a republican system. A notable period was the time in the late 18th century and early 19th century when many Radicals such as the minister Joseph Fawcett were openly republican.

American and French Revolutions 

The American Revolution had a great impact on political thought in Ireland and Britain. According to Christopher Hitchens, the British–American author, philosopher, politician and activist, Thomas Paine was the "moral author of the American Revolution", who posited in the soon widely read pamphlet Common Sense (January 1776) that the conflict of the Thirteen Colonies with the Hanoverian monarchy in London was best resolved by setting up a separate democratic republic. To him, republicanism was more important than independence. However, the circumstances forced the American revolutionaries to give up any hope of reconciliation with Britain, and reforming its 'corrupt' monarchial government, that so often dragged the American colonies in its European wars, from within. He and other British republican writers saw in the Declaration of Independence (4 July 1776) a legitimate struggle against the Crown, that violated people's freedom and rights, and denied them representation in politics.

When the French Revolution broke out in 1789, debates started in the British Isles on how to respond. Soon a pro-Revolutionary republican and anti-Revolutionary monarchist camp had established themselves amongst the intelligentsia, who waged a pamphlet war until 1795. Prominent figures of the republican camp were Mary Wollstonecraft, William Godwin and Paine.

Paine would also play an important role inside the revolution in France as an elected member of the National Convention (1792–3), where he lobbied for an invasion of Britain to establish a republic after the example of the United States, France and its Sister Republics, but also opposed the execution of Louis XVI, which got him arrested. The First French Republic would indeed stage an expedition to Ireland in December 1796 to help the Society of United Irishmen set up an Irish republic in order to destabilise the United Kingdom, but this ended in a failure. The subsequent Irish Rebellion of 1798 was suppressed by forces of the British Crown. Napoleon also planned an invasion of Britain since 1798 and more seriously since 1803, but in 1804 he relinquished republicanism by crowning himself Emperor of the French and converting all Sister Republics into client kingdoms of the French Empire, before calling off the invasion of Britain altogether in 1805.

Revolutionary republicanism, 1800–1848 

From the start of the French Revolution into the early 19th century, the revolutionary blue-white-red tricolour was used throughout England, Wales and Ireland in defiance of the royal establishment. During the 1816 Spa Fields riots, a green, white and red horizontal flag appeared for the first time, soon followed by a red, white and green horizontal version allegedly in use during the 1817 Pentrich rising and the 1819 Peterloo Massacre. The latter is now associated with Hungary, but then it became known as the British Republican Flag. It may have been inspired by the French revolutionary tricolour, but this is unclear. It was however often accompanied by slogans consisting of three words such as "Fraternity – Liberty – Humanity" (a clear reference to Liberté, égalité, fraternité), and adopted by the Chartist movement in the 1830s.

Besides these skirmishes in Great Britain itself, separatist republican revolutions against the British monarchy during the Canadian rebellions of 1837–38 and the Young Irelander Rebellion of 1848 failed.

Parliament passed the Treason Felony Act in 1848. This act made advocacy of republicanism punishable by transportation to Australia, which was later amended to life imprisonment. The law is still on the statute books; however in a 2003 case, the Law Lords stated that "It is plain as a pike staff to the respondents and everyone else that no one who advocates the peaceful abolition of the monarchy and its replacement by a republican form of government is at any risk of prosecution", for the reason that the Human Rights Act 1998 would require the 1848 Act to be interpreted in such a way as to render such conduct non-criminal.

Late 19th century 
During the later years of Queen Victoria's reign, there was considerable criticism of her decision to withdraw from public life following the death of her husband, Prince Albert. This resulted in a "significant incarnation" of republicanism. During the 1870s, calls for Britain to become a republic on the American or French model were made by the politicians Charles Dilke and Charles Bradlaugh, as well as journalist George W. M. Reynolds. This republican presence continued in debates and the Labour press, especially in the event of royal weddings, jubilees and births, until well into the Interwar period.

Some members of the Labour Party, such as Keir Hardie (1856–1915), also held republican views.

20th-century republicanism 
In 1923, at the Labour Party's annual conference, two motions were proposed, supported by Ernest Thurtle and Emrys Hughes. The first was "that the Royal Family is no longer a necessary party of the British constitution", and the second was "that the hereditary principle in the British Constitution be abolished". George Lansbury responded that, although he too was a republican, he regarded the issue of the monarchy as a "distraction" from more important issues. Lansbury added that he believed the "social revolution" would eventually remove the monarchy peacefully in the future. Both of the motions were overwhelmingly defeated. Following this event, most of the Labour Party moved away from advocating republican views. In 1936, following the abdication of Edward VIII, MP James Maxton proposed a "republican amendment" to the Abdication Bill, which would have established a Republic in Britain. Maxton argued that while the monarchy had benefited Britain in the past, it had now "outlived its usefulness". Five MPs voted to support the bill, including Alfred Salter. However the bill was defeated by 403 votes.

Willie Hamilton, a republican Scottish Labour MP who served from 1950 to 1987, was known for his outspoken anti-royal views. He discussed these at length in his 1975 book My Queen and I.

The pressure group Republic, which campaigns for a republic in the United Kingdom, was formed in 1983.

In 1991, Labour MP Tony Benn introduced the Commonwealth of Britain Bill, which called for the transformation of the United Kingdom into a "democratic, federal and secular Commonwealth of Britain", with an elected president. The monarchy would be abolished and replaced by a republic with a written constitution. It was read in Parliament a number of times until his retirement at the 2001 election, but never achieved a second reading. Benn presented an account of his proposal in Common Sense: A New Constitution for Britain.

In January 1997, ITV broadcast a live television debate Monarchy: The Nation Decides, in which 2.5 million viewers voted on the question "Do you want a monarch?" by telephone. Speaking for the republican view were Professor Stephen Haseler, (chairman of Republic), agony aunt Claire Rayner, Paul Flynn, Labour MP for Newport West and Andrew Neil, then the former editor of The Sunday Times. Those in favour of the monarchy included author Frederick Forsyth, Bernie Grant, Labour MP for Tottenham, and Jeffrey Archer, former deputy chairman of the Conservative Party. Conservative MP Steven Norris was scheduled to appear in a discussion towards the end of the programme, but officials from Carlton Television said he had left without explanation. The debate was conducted in front of an audience of 3,000 at the National Exhibition Centre in Birmingham, with the telephone poll result being that 66% of voters wanted a monarch, and 34% did not.

At the annual State Opening of Parliament, MPs are summoned to the House of Lords for the Queen's Speech. From the 1990s until the 2010s, republican MP Dennis Skinner regularly made a retort to Black Rod, the official who commands the House of Commons to attend the speech. Skinner had previously remained in the Commons for the speech.

21st-century republicanism 
MORI polls in the opening years of the 21st century showed support for retaining the monarchy stable at around 70% of people, but in 2005, at the time of the wedding of Prince Charles and Camilla Parker Bowles, support for the monarchy dipped, with one poll showing that 65% of people would support keeping the monarchy if there were a referendum on the issue, with 22% saying they favoured a republic. In 2009 an ICM poll, commissioned by the BBC, found that 76% of those asked wanted the monarchy to continue after the Queen, against 18% of people who said they would favour Britain becoming a republic and 6% who said they did not know.

In February 2011, a YouGov poll put support for ending the monarchy after the Queen's death at 13%, if Prince Charles became king. However, an ICM poll shortly before the wedding of Prince William and Kate Middleton on 29 April 2011, suggested that 26% thought Britain would be better off without the monarchy, with only 37% "genuinely interested and excited" by the wedding. Also taken in April 2011, an Ipsos MORI poll of 1,000 British adults found that 75% of the public would like Britain to remain a monarchy, with 18% in favour of Britain becoming a republic. In May 2012, in the lead up to the Queen's Diamond Jubilee, an Ipsos MORI poll of 1,006 British adults found that 80% were in favour of the monarchy, with 13% in favour of the United Kingdom becoming a republic. This was thought to be a record-high figure in recent years in favour of the monarchy.

In September 2015, Jeremy Corbyn, a Labour MP with republican views, won his party's leadership election and became both Leader of the Opposition and Leader of the Labour Party. In 1991, Corbyn had seconded the Commonwealth of Britain Bill. However, Corbyn stated during his 2015 campaign for the leadership that republicanism was "not a battle that I am fighting".

At the swearing of oaths in the Commons following the 2017 general election, Republic reported that several MPs had prefixed their parliamentary oath of allegiance with broadly republican sentiments, such as a statement referring to their constituents, rather than the Queen. If an MP does not take the oath or the affirmation to the Queen, they will not be able to take part in parliamentary proceedings or paid any salary and allowances until they have done so. Such MPs included Richard Burgon, Laura Pidcock, Dennis Skinner, Chris Williamson, Paul Flynn, Jeff Smith, and Emma Dent Coad. Roger Godsiff and Alex Sobel also expressed sympathy for an oath to their constituents.

In May 2021, a YouGov poll put support for the monarchy down at 61% (with 24% against) among all over-18s, with a particularly high rise in republican views and an overall plurality for its replacement with an elected head of state in the 18–24 age group (41%–31%). The poll also suggested significant reductions in support for the monarchy in 25–49 year olds, and a slight fall in support among over 65s.

In May 2022, ahead of the Queen's Platinum Jubilee, another YouGov poll showed that only 31% of 18–24 year olds were in favour of the monarchy, compared to 66% of the population as a whole. Four months later, in the wake of the Queen's death, this figure stood firm at 67%.  

Protests against the monarchy of King Charles III have expressed and included blank pieces of paper, heckling during royal processions involving Prince Andrew and egging attempts.

Support for Republicanism in the United Kingdom 

A number of prominent individuals in the United Kingdom advocate republicanism.

Political parties
, none of the three major British political parties—the Labour Party, the Conservative Party, and the Liberal Democrats—have an official policy of republicanism. However, there are a number of individual politicians who favour abolition of the monarchy.

Although its membership includes both republicans and monarchists, the Scottish National Party, which supports Scottish independence, does not have an official policy of republicanism, and instead favours making a decision on the head of state of an independent Scotland only after independence is attained in itself. The Green Party of England and Wales, with one MP in Parliament since 2010, has an official policy of republicanism. The Irish republican party Sinn Féin has seven MPs, but they do not take their UK parliamentary seats as a rejection of British authority in Northern Ireland. The Scottish Greens, with eight MSPs in the 2021–2026 Scottish Parliament, support having an elected head of state in an independent Scotland.

Labour for a Republic is a republican pressure group of Labour Party members and supporters, founded by Labour politician Ken Ritchie in May 2011. It held its first meeting in 2012. Efforts to get the campaign started were then unsuccessful. It has since held fringe meetings, and other informal meetings, and appeared in the media on a few occasions. As of September 2022, its chairman is Nick Wall. The organisation held a fringe event at the Labour Party's annual conference on 25 September 2022, which attracted large crowds, and included The Guardians columnist Polly Toynbee, author Paul Richards, and expert in constitutional law Dr Adam Tucker as panellists. In response to the Labour Party's decision to sing "God Save the King" at the conference, panellists and those who attended the event said they did not want to see it booed or heckled. It was reported that the singing was not disrupted, and that the minute of silence for Elizabeth II was observed without failure.

It is rare for a high-profile British politician to identify with republicanism, even among those who campaigned for a republic earlier in their careers. Former UK prime minister Liz Truss was an advocate of republicanism prior to becoming a Conservative MP. Labour Party leader Sir Keir Starmer was, at an earlier time in his career, also on record as a republican, but no longer identifies as one. His predecessor as Labour leader, Jeremy Corbyn, although an avowed left-winger, also stressed that his personal support for republicanism would not influence his policy agenda.

Republic 

The largest lobby group in favour of republicanism in the United Kingdom is the Republic campaign group, founded in 1983. The group has benefited from occasional negative publicity about the Royal Family, and Republic reported a large rise in membership following the wedding of then-Prince Charles and Camilla Parker-Bowles. Republic has lobbied on changes to the parliamentary oath of allegiance, royal finances and changes to the Freedom of Information Act relating to the monarchy, none of which have produced any change. However, Republic has been invited to Parliament to talk as witnesses on certain issues related to the monarchy such as conduct of the honours system in the United Kingdom.

In 2009, Republic made news by reporting Prince Charles's architecture charity to the Charity Commission, claiming that the Prince was effectively using the organisation as a private lobbying firm (the Commission declined to take the matter further). Republic has previously broken stories about royals using the Freedom of Information Act.

Media
Newspapers The Guardian, The Observer, The Economist and The Independent have all advocated the abolition of the monarchy. In the wake of the 2009 MPs' expenses scandal, a poll of readers of The Guardian and The Observer placed support for abolition of the monarchy at 54%, although only 3% saw it as a top priority. The online magazine Spiked supports republicanism.

Opinion polling

Graphical summary 

The chart below shows opinion polls conducted about whether the United Kingdom should become a republic. The trend lines are local regressions (LOESS).

Poll results 
Various questions have been asked by opinion polling companies. The following table includes a selection of polls of the general public summarised by whether respondents support the continuation of the monarchy or its abolition (whether or not a republic is specified). Polling suggests that a large majority of Britons were in favour of the monarchy during the 1990s and 2000s, with support mostly ranging from 70% to 74%, never falling below 65%. Support appeared to strengthen in the early to mid 2010s, with most polls during this period suggesting that between 75% and 80% (and all suggesting at least 69%) of the public were in favour of the monarchy. The level of support for the institution has declined since 2019, ranging between 50% to 68% since then. Polls since the 1990s have shown the proportion favouring a republic as ranging from 13% to 34%. The figure appears to have slightly increased in recent years, but has consistently remained a significantly less popular position than maintaining the monarchy. The monarchy is somewhat less popular among Black British groups, British Asians, and younger Britons under 35. The aforementioned groups are generally more in favour of a republic.

Notes

Arguments
The public debate around republicanism has centred around the core republican argument that a republic is more democratic and compatible with the notion of popular sovereignty. The advocacy group Republic argues: 

The core anti-republican defense is that there is nothing in a republic that is inherently more democratic compared to a constitutional monarchy when both forms of government are based on parliamentarianism and constitutionalism, and that traditional institutions have confirmed the citizens as sovereign beings.

See also

Abolition of monarchy
Constitutional reform in the United Kingdom
Criticism of monarchy
Irish republicanism
List of advocates of republicanism in the United Kingdom
Movement Against the Monarchy
Republicanism in Northern Ireland
Republics in the Commonwealth of Nations
Scottish republicanism
Secular state
Welsh republicanism

References

Further reading

 Tony Benn’s Plan to Democratise Britain – and Abolish the Monarchy. An article in Tribune magazine written by Martyn Rush. Published 26 February 2021.

External links
Republic website and Republic Twitter page
Labour for a Republic website
Throneout website and Throneout Facebook page
Centre for Citizenship
International Monarchist League
BritRepub Twitter page
Res Publica: Britain international anti-monarchy Web directory
The Democratic Republican Party
The Electoral Commission

 
United Kingdom